Pavlos Makrygiannis (born 20 June 1995) is a Greek professional footballer who plays as a winger for Football League club Egaleo.

References

1998 births
Living people
Football League (Greece) players
Gamma Ethniki players
Acharnaikos F.C. players
Tilikratis F.C. players
Kallithea F.C. players
Egaleo F.C. players
Association football wingers
Footballers from Athens
Greek footballers